Coventry Archives is a records archive and local history centre for the city of Coventry, England. It is housed in Herbert Art Gallery and Museum and is one of 4 institutions owned by the Culture Coventry Trust, the other three being Herbert Art Gallery and Museum, the Lunt Roman Fort and the Coventry Transport Museum.

History 
The Archives was set up in 2008 during the refurbishment of Herbert Art Gallery and Museum, and was designed by Demco Interiors. It was set up to combine the former Coventry Archives and Local Studies Library.

In September 2018, the Coventry Archives underwent a name and brand change it was renamed after the old 'Coventry History Centre'.

Collections 

The History Centre houses archive collections ranging from medieval times to the present day. Collections are available as:
Oral history recordings
Maps
Plans
Printed books and pamphlets

References

External links 

Archives in the United Kingdom
Coventry
History of Coventry